Will Hill Acker (December 17, 1899 – July 28, 1951) was an American football player and coach and college athletics administrator. He served as the head football coach at East Texas State Teachers College—now known as Texas A&M University–Commerce—from 1929 to 1930. Acker was also head basketball coach at East Texas State from 1928 to 1930 and the school's athletic director from 1930 to 1949.

Personal life
Acker was born December 17, 1899 in Ellis County, Texas to Walter L. Acker and Pearl Hill.

In 1918, during World War I, Acker belonged to the Student Army Training Corps while at Christian College of North Texas.

Acker died on July 28, 1951, at a hospital in Greenville, Texas, from injuries he sustained four days earlier in an automobile accident.

Head coaching record

Football

References

External links
 

1899 births
1951 deaths
American football tackles
TCU Horned Frogs football players
Texas A&M–Commerce Lions athletic directors
Texas A&M–Commerce Lions football coaches
Texas A&M–Commerce Lions men's basketball coaches
Coaches of American football from Texas
Players of American football from Texas
Basketball coaches from Texas
Road incident deaths in Texas